Ayatollah Hashemi Rafsanjani Airport  is an airport in Kerman, Iran. The airport is used for commercial, general aviation and military training purposes. Flights began operating in 1970.

Mahan Air flight crew's simulator centre and cabin crew training centre is located at Kerman INTL Airport. It is also the main hub for Bootia-Mahan Aviation College  for commercial pilot training purpose for Mahan Air's cadet pilot program.

Airlines and destinations

See also
List of airports in Iran
List of the busiest airports in Iran

References

Airports in Iran
Transportation in Kerman Province
Buildings and structures in Kerman Province
Kerman